Swing and Soul is an album by jazz saxophonist Lou Donaldson recorded for the Blue Note label and performed by Donaldson's Quintet with Herman Foster, Peck Morrison, Dave Bailey, and Ray Barretto. The album was awarded 3 stars by Allmusic reviewers.

Track listing
All compositions by Lou Donaldson, except as indicated
 "Dorothy" (Rudy Nichols) - 5:25
 "I Won't Cry Any More" (Al Frisch, Fritz Wise) - 4:23
 "Herman's Mambo" (Herman Foster) - 4:56
 "Peck Time" - 5:23
 "There'll Never Be Another You" (Mack Gordon, Harry Warren) - 5:08
 "Groove Junction" - 6:19
 "Grits and Gravy" - 6:18

Personnel
Lou Donaldson - alto saxophone
Herman Foster - piano
Peck Morrison - bass
Dave Bailey - drums
Ray Barretto - congas

Production
 Alfred Lion - producer
 Reid Miles - design
 Rudy Van Gelder - engineer
 Francis Wolff - photography

References

Lou Donaldson albums
1957 albums
Blue Note Records albums
Albums produced by Alfred Lion
Albums recorded at Van Gelder Studio